In enzymology, a 4-acetamidobutyrate deacetylase is an enzyme that catalyzes the chemical reaction

4-acetamidobutanoate + H2O  acetate + 4-aminobutanoate

Thus, the two substrates of this enzyme are 4-acetamidobutanoate and H2O, whereas its two products are acetate and 4-aminobutanoate.

This enzyme belongs to the family of hydrolases, those acting on carbon-nitrogen bonds other than peptide bonds, specifically in linear amides.  The systematic name of this enzyme class is 4-acetamidobutanoate amidohydrolase. This enzyme participates in urea cycle and metabolism of amino groups and lysine degradation.

References

 

EC 3.5.1
Enzymes of unknown structure